Maxime Drouot, known by his pen name Maxime Chattam or Maxime Williams, is a French novelist who, after studying criminology, specialized in writing crime novels.

Biography 
His father worked for a magazine as an artistic director while his mother was an executive secretary Throughout his childhood Chattam would frequently visit the United States. His first visit was to Portland, Oregon which would later inspire his first novel. He completed his schooling at lycée Montesquieu à Herblay, continuing to l'Université Paris X-III-Nord. During his childhood, he wanted to become an actor. He took comedy courses at Cours Simon in Paris.

In 1988, he spent some time in the Thai jungle. While there he wrote a diary, which would become his first experience with writing. He continued writing into the early 1990s. His first literary essays were inspired by the Stephen King film Stand by Me. He drafted his first novel, Le Coma des mortels, which tells the story of a young man fallen into a coma following an accident, which is later revealed as an attempted murder.

He resumed his studies, focused on modern literature. He wrote Le Cinquième Règne, published in 2003 under the pen name Maxime Williams. It would go on to win the fantastic novel prize at the festival de Gérardmer. He then spent a year studying criminology at the université de Saint-Denis. Over the course of this year, he would learn the basics of criminal psychology, police science and techniques, and medical jurisprudence.

L'Âme du mal (published in 2002, under the pen name « Chattam », inspired by a small town in Louisiana) recounts an investigation by Joshua Brolin, ex-FBI agent turned Portland Police Officer, aided by a young psychology student. A killer seems to have revived his mutilated victims through a ritual only leaving clues from a black Bible.

The second installment in the trilogy following Joshua Brolin is In Tenebris (published in 2003) set in a dark and gritty New York.  A woman found traumatized claims that she has come back from Hell.  Officer Annabel O'Donnel leads the investigation, helped by a decommissioned Brolin.

In Maléfices (published in 2004), Brolin and O'Donnel face off against a serial killer who mummifies their victims in a spider web.

He would later write a prequel to the trilogy, La Promesse des ténèbres. This novel follows Brady O'Donnel, husband of Annabel O'Donnel.

In 2019, his editor indicated he had sold 7 million copies of his work since 2001.

Chattam is a member of the art collective La Ligue de l'Imaginaire.

Maxime Chattam is married to Faustine Bollaert. They have one daughter and one son.

Selected works

Trilogy of Evil 

 L'Âme du mal, Michel Lafon « Thriller », 2002 Grand prix Sang d'encre 2002
 In Tenebris, Michel Lafon « Thriller », 2003
 Maléfices, Michel Lafon « Thriller », 2004
 Spin-off: La Promesse des ténèbres, Albin Michel, à009

The Cycle of Man and Truth 

 Les Arcanes du chaos, Albin Michel « Spécial suspense », 2006
 Prédateurs, Albin Michel « Spécial suspense », 2007
 La Théorie Gaïa, Albin Michel « Spécial suspense », 2008

The Diptych of Time 

 Léviatemps, Albin Michel, 2010 .
 Le Requiem des abysses, Albin Michel, 2011 .

Ludivine Vancker 

 La Conjuration primitive, Albin Michel, 2012 
 La Patience du diable, Albin Michel, 2014 
 L'Appel du néant, Albin Michel, 2017 
 La Constance du prédateur, Albin Michel, 2022

Independent novels 

 Le Cinquième Règne, sous le pseudonyme de Maxime Williams - Prix du Roman Fantastic'Arts du Festival de Gérardmer 2003, Masque GF, 2003
 Le Sang du temps, Michel Lafon, coll. « Thriller », 2005
 Que ta volonté soit faite, Albin Michel, 2015 
 Le Coma des mortels, Albin Michel, 2016 
 Le Signal, Albin Michel, 2018 
 Un(e)secte, Albin Michel, 2019 
 L'Illusion, Albin Michel, 2020 
 Le Mal, 1995 (Disponible sur le site officiel)

Graphic Novels 

 La Trilogie du mal. Volume 1, Le Bourreau de Portland / scénario Maxime Chattam ; dessin Michel Montheillet. Coéd. Jungle - Michel Lafon, 2012, 44 p. 
 La Trilogie du mal. Volume 2, Écrit sur les portes de l'enfer / scénario Maxime Chattam ; dessin Michel Montheillet. Coéd. Jungle - Michel Lafon, 2013, 54 p. 
 La Trilogie du mal. Volume 3, L'Âme du mal / scénario Maxime Chattam ; dessin Michel Montheillet ; couleurs Brett Smit. Coéd. Jungle - Michel Lafon, 2016, 56 p.

Prefaces

Adaptations 

 L'âme du mal : téléfilm de 2011, inspiré de son roman
 Le signal : série en préparation annoncée début avril 2022 par l'auteur sur Twitter

References

External links 

 

Living people
Pseudonymous writers
French crime fiction writers
French novelists
Year of birth missing (living people)